Rockin' the Joint is a live album by Aerosmith, which was released on October 25, 2005. It was recorded in January 2002 in The Joint at the Hard Rock Hotel in Las Vegas, and consists of Aerosmith classics and more recent songs performed live.

CD

"The Star Spangled Banner" appeared as a hidden track at the end of "Train Kept A Rollin'"

DVD

Complete setlist at The Joint 

 Beyond Beautiful
 Toys In The Attic
 Love In An Elevator*
 Just Push Play*
 Same Old Song And Dance
 Jaded*
 Big Ten Inch Record
 Pink *
 Sick As A Dog*
 Seasons of Wither
 Light Inside
 No More, No More
 Dream On
 Drop Dead Gorgeous*
 Stop Messin' Around*
 Draw The Line
 I Don't Want To Miss A Thing
 Cryin'*
 Mother Popcorn*
 Walk This Way
 Uncle Salty*
 Sweet Emotion
 Rattlesnake Shake
 Livin' On The Edge
 What It Takes
 Train Kept A Rollin'/The Star Spangled Banner

*Recorded but not released.

Personnel 

Aerosmith
Steven Tyler – lead vocals, harmonica, mixing, producer
Joe Perry – guitar, backing vocals
Brad Whitford – guitar
Tom Hamilton – bass
Joey Kramer – drums, percussion
Additional musicians
 Russ Irwin – keyboards, backing vocals
Production
Marti Frederiksen – producer, mixing
Guy Charbonneau – engineer
Sean Evans – art direction
Ian Gittler – photography

Charts

Album

Release history

References

External links

Albums produced by Marti Frederiksen
2005 live albums
Columbia Records live albums
Aerosmith live albums
Albums recorded at the Hard Rock Hotel and Casino (Las Vegas)
Hard Rock Hotel and Casino (Las Vegas)